Der Kaiser von Schexing is a German television series produced by Bayerischer Rundfunk. It takes place in the fictitious community of Markt Schexing in the district of Ebersberg.

It was filmed in Unterföhring, Rain, and Isen.

See also
List of German television series

References

External links
 

2008 German television series debuts
2011 German television series endings
Television shows set in Bavaria
German-language television shows
Das Erste original programming